The 2010–11 California Golden Bears men's basketball team represented the University of California, Berkeley in the 2010–11 NCAA Division I men's basketball season. This was head coach Mike Montgomery's third season at California. The Golden Bears played their home games at Haas Pavilion and participate in the Pacific-10 Conference. The Golden Bears finished the season 18–15, 10–8 in Pac-10 play. They lost to USC in the quarterfinals Pac-10 tournament. They were invited to the 2011 National Invitation Tournament before losing in the second round by Colorado.

Roster

Coaching staff

Schedule and results
Source
All times are Pacific

|-
!colspan=9| Exhibition

|-
!colspan=9| Regular season

|-
!colspan=9| 2011 Pacific-10 Conference men's basketball tournament

|-
!colspan=9| NIT
|-

|-

References

External links
CalBears.com 

California
California
California Golden Bears men's basketball seasons
California Golden
California Golden